Srubec is a municipality and village in České Budějovice District in the South Bohemian Region of the Czech Republic. It has about 2,900 inhabitants.

Administrative parts
The village of Stará Pohůrka is an administrative part of Srubec.

Geography
It lies in the Třeboň Basin.

References

Villages in České Budějovice District